Prahladpuri Temple was a Hindu temple located in Multan city of Punjab province in Pakistan, adjacent to the Shrine of Bahauddin Zakariya. Named after Prahlada, it is dedicated to the Hindu deity Narasimha. The temple is in ruins, since its destruction in 1992 by a Muslim mob. The site is currently owned by Evacuee Trust Property Board.

Location 
The temple is located on top of a raised platform (mandapa) at the southern tip of the Fort of Multan, adjacent to the mausoleum of Baha’ul Haq Zakariya.

History

Hindu Folklore 
In Hindu folklore, Prahlada — son of Hiranyakashipu, the Asur-king of Multan — built the temple in honor of Narasimha, an incarnation of Vishnu, who had appeared out of a pillar in the royal court to disembowel the oppressive King and reward his devoutness. The temple was constructed around the pillar and the festival of Holika Dahan commenced.

Pre-modern India 
The temple stands on the ruins of pre-Muslim structures. There were older temples on the site which had been subject to cycles of razing and re-construction during the medieval era — however, the precise details are hazy in light of conflicting legends. Initially, the place might have housed the famed Sun-temple of Multan.

Oral legend asserts that a temple — with columns and roof made of gold — used to exist around the 15th century before being dismantled by Sher Shah Suri to construct a mosque; the current temple was constructed when the mosque fell. Another account published in Calcutta Review (1891) invokes the same description except that the pre-existing temple had sunk of "unknown causes."

Colonial India 
In 1810, the temple's height was raised (or, was the temple rebuilt - ?), which led to tensions with the Muslim community. In 1831, Alexander Burnes noted the temple as a low-height structure, supported by wooden pillars and having Hanuman and Ganesha as the portal guardians; he was denied entrance to what had been "the only place of Hindu worship in Multan". An annual festival was held on the temple's premises on the anniversary of Narasimha's appearance.

During the Siege of Multan in 1848, a shell fired by forces of the East India Company fell on a gunpowder store within the fort and blew away the temple's roof. Post-siege, the East India Company retained total control of the fort and all adjacent areas — including the temple and the mausoleum — for a couple of years before returning the shrines to native communities in July 1852 upon a petition. A month later, the Company prohibited approaching the temple via precincts of the mausoleum in lieu of allowing a request from local Hindus to refurbish the temple. Upon visiting the site in 1854, Alexander Cunningham found the temple to be a roofless "square brick building with some very finely carved wooden pillars", and the only Hindu shrine in Multan alongside Suraj Kund.

In 1859, local Hindus and Muslims agreed not to incorporate conspicuous additions to the temple or the mausoleum. In 1861, the Chief Mahant of the temple, Baba Ram Das, raised about Rs.11,000 by way of public donation to refurbish the temple. In the early 1870s, his successor, Baba Narayan Das, proposed to increase the height of the temple spire to 44 ft — more than that of the mausoleum — with public donation. This proposal was opposed by local Muslims as a breach of the agreement in 1859, fomenting an acrimonious dispute. Eventually, the local administration decided the issue in favor of the Muslims; an agreement enacted on 14 April 1876 restricted the height to 33 ft. However, the Hindus were not content and sought to vacate it.

Multan Riots 
In August 1880, the Mahant obtained consent from local civil and military authorities to install the 45 ft. spire. Construction continued for about three months before the Mahdoom of the mausoleum petitioned Cordery, the Commissioner of Multan, for a cease order. Upon investigation, Cordery reported to Lt. Governor Egerton, who decided to not only reinstate the 1876 agreement but also ask Hindus to cede possession of the compound well and an adjacent plot. The Hindus appealed before Viceroy Ripon, and c. August 1881, a committee composed of six people each from the Hindu and Muslim community was set up to arrive at a compromise — their proposed solution was to allow the spire but as a compensation, grant the sole possession of the well and ownership of the plot to the Muslims. 

Before the solution could be approved by the government and implemented, the town got enmeshed in the communal tensions fomenting across Punjab against the backdrop of Arya Samaj's cow-protectionist movements. The question of transport and sale of beef in Multan town became an affair of competitive communalism. On 20 September 1881, a riot erupted and spanned over two days, resulting in 50,000 rupees worth of damage but no casualties. Hindu rioters had burned a mosque in the city's bazaar, attacked the Walli Muhammadi Mosque, and incinerated a Quran. A Muslim mob retaliated about 2 hours later, arsoning the Prahladpuri temple. However, the temple was quickly renovated by the Hindu community.  

Finally, on 14 October, the government issued its decision — the local authority lacked jurisdiction to decide on the issue of additions to the temple structure, and hence, the Hindus were to either dismantle the spire or follow the compromise arrived at by the committee. On 29 October, the Hindus decided in favor of the latter. A well for the Hindus was constructed in an adjacent plot and a wall erected between the mausoleum and the temple.

Beyond riots 
In the early morning of 7 November 1912, miscreants removed an image of Lakshmi and threw it in a nearby well after stealing the crown; the Hindu devotees blamed local Muslims. On 23 January 1913, a Panchayat (trans. assemblage) of Hindus removed the incumbent Mahant leading to protracted litigation.

Independent Pakistan
After the creation of Pakistan, most Hindus migrated to India, but the few remaining Hindus of the city continued to manage the temple affairs. Eventually, the image of Narasimha was taken away to a temple in Haridwar in the 70s, and the Evacuee Trust Property Board (ETPB) took over the site, in whose hands it fell into a state of neglect; a madrasa got established inside the temple premises. Despite this, the temple continued to be a prominent landmark in Multan and even had a dharamshala.

Destruction and aftermath 
In 1992, a Muslim mob destroyed the temple and the dharamshala in retaliation for Hindus razing the Babri Masjid in Ayodhya, India; they also targeted local Hindus. The temple continues to be in ruins. By 2006, squatters had encroached on the lower levels of the ruined structure, and garbage was regularly dumped at the site.

Proposed Reconstructions
In 2009, the Central Government allocated funds to document and preserve the site; the survey determined a risk of an imminent collapse of the temple ruins, but preservation plans were shelved. In May 2015, ETPB announced new plans to restore the temple and, in August, granted a fund of 5 million PKR to the Punjab Archeology Department. However, the local administration refused to issue a No Objection Certificate, apparently fearing local Muslim fanatics.

In February 2021, the Supreme Court of Pakistan established a one-person commission to interrogate the status of minority religious shrines. It criticized ETPB's handling of Hindu shrines and submitted for the immediate restoration of the temple along with the construction of lodging facilities for potential tourists; the State of Punjab and ETPB were ordered to ensure optimum preparedness of the shrine for the Holi festival. Soon, the local "peace committee" — with representatives from the government, civil society, and Ulemas — announced plans to restore the temple to ensure religious harmony.

Architecture 

Prior to being demolished, the temple featured a main hall, and circumlocutory passages adorned with skylights. The hall continued to feature a replica of the idol under a baldachin.

See also

 Multan Sun Temple
 Hinduism in Pakistan
 Evacuee Trust Property Board
 Mankiala stupa
 Hinglaj Mata
 Kalat Kali Temple
 Katasraj temple 
 Multan Sun Temple
 Sadh Belo
 Shivaharkaray
 Shiv Mandir, Umerkot
 Shri Varun Dev Mandir
 Tilla Jogian

Notes

References 

Hindu temples in Punjab, Pakistan
Destroyed Hindu temples
Hindu pilgrimage sites in Pakistan
Buildings and structures in Multan
Buildings and structures demolished in 1992